Persatuan Sepakbola Pinrang (simply known as Perspin Pinrang) is an Indonesian football club based in Pinrang Regency, South Sulawesi. They currently compete in the Liga 3.

Honours
 Liga 3 South Sulawesi
 Champion: 2019
 Runner-up: 2017

References

External links

Sport in South Sulawesi
Football clubs in Indonesia
Football clubs in South Sulawesi